The 2008 Dodge Challenger 500,  the 52nd running of the event, was the eleventh race on the NASCAR Sprint Cup season. It was held on Saturday, May 10, 2008 at the fabled Darlington Raceway in Darlington, South Carolina.

Summary
The race was televised in the USA on Fox starting at 7 PM US EDT with radio being handled on MRN on terrestrial radio and Sirius Satellite Radio. It was the first race on the newly repaved 1.366 mile track as "The Lady in Black" has gone under an extreme makeover akin to plastic surgery, with speeds at Goodyear tire testing in March having cars clocked at or over 200 MPH.

The race also served as the last chance to qualify for Sprint All-Star Race XXIV to be held the following week at Lowe's Motor Speedway in Concord, North Carolina.  Otherwise, those who have not won a race, a series championship or a previous All-Star race would have to qualify via the Sprint Showdown race as one of the top two finishers or through fan voting by being on the lead lap in the Showdown.

Pre-race news
Back in the saddle for the #40 Chip Ganassi Racing Dodge was Sterling Marlin after Ken Schrader failed to make the Richmond race the previous week. Another change found Jeff Green replacing John Andretti in the #34 car, however they failed to qualify.

Qualifying
Greg Biffle edged out Dale Earnhardt Jr. for the pole position.

Race

After getting a rousing chorus of booing from Earnhardt fans for what he did the previous week at Richmond, Kyle Busch quieted them down with his third win of the 2008 campaign.

Other finishers in the top ten were Carl Edwards, Jeff Gordon, Dale Earnhardt Jr., David Ragan, Matt Kenseth, Denny Hamlin, Travis Kvapil, Dave Blaney and Jeff Burton.

Failed to Qualify: Johnny Sauter (#70), Jeff Green (#34).

Top 10 results

References

Dodge Challenger 500
Dodge Challenger 500
NASCAR races at Darlington Raceway